The Montenegrin Cup for Women (Montenegrin: Kup Crne Gore za žene) is the national women's association football cup competition in Montenegro. It was founded in 2015, seven years after the formation of the Montenegrin Women's League.

History
After the establishment of Montenegrin Women's League in 2008, the Football Association of Montenegro organised the first edition of Montenegrin Women's Cup for the 2015-16 season. The inaugural season of the Montenegrin Women's Cup had seven participants, with the first round being the quarterfinals.
The first winner of Montenegrin Cup was ŽFK Ekonomist.

Finals
The finals played so far are:

Trophies by team

See also
Montenegrin Women's League
Football Association of Montenegro
Football in Montenegro
Montenegrin Cup

References

External links
Football Association of Montenegro

Montenegro
Cup
Cup
Women's sports competitions in Montenegro